The KGB is a former Soviet intelligence agency.

KGB may also refer to:

Organizations
 State Security Committee of the Republic of Belarus (KGB)
 Knowledge Generation Bureau (stylized kgb), a directory assistance and knowledge market company
 Kerala Gramin Bank

Entertainment and media
 KGB (bar), in New York City
 KGB (AM), a radio station (760 AM) in San Diego, California, U.S.
 KLSD, a radio station (1360 AM) in San Diego, California, U.S., known as KGB from 1928 to 1982
 KGB-FM, a radio station (101.5 FM) in San Diego, California, U.S.
 KGB (San Francisco), an AM radio station licensed from 1921 to 1922 
 KGB (video game)
 "KGB", a character in the movie Rounders

Other
 Andrea Lee (fighter), mixed-martial artist known as KGB
 Kabeer Gbaja-Biamila, American football player
 Kerb-guided bus
 Ketchikan Gateway Borough, Alaska
 KGB Archiver, a file archiver and data compression utility
 R v B (KG), popularly know as the "KGB Case", a leading Supreme Court of Canada case on hearsay
 Kyle Gass Band, US
 Station code for Ketanggungan Barat railway station